Alexandre Jean Albert Lavignac (21 January 1846 – 28 May 1916) was a French music scholar, known for his essays on theory, and a minor composer.

Biography
Lavignac was born in Paris and studied with Antoine François Marmontel, François Benoist and Ambroise Thomas at the Conservatoire de Paris, where later he taught harmony. Among his pupils were Henri Casadesus, Claude Debussy, Vincent d'Indy, Amédée Gastoué, Philipp Jarnach, Henri O'Kelly, Gabriel Pierné, Wadia Sabra, Florent Schmitt. 

In March 1864, at the age of eighteen, he conducted from the harmonium the private premiere of Gioachino Rossini's Petite messe solennelle.

His condensed work, La Musique et les Musiciens, an overview of musical grammar and materials, continued to be reprinted years after his death. In it he characterised the particular characteristics of instruments and of each key, somewhat in the way Berlioz and Gevaert (Traité d'orchestration, Gand, 1863, p. 189) had done:

Major keys:

C-sharp major:  ? ("?")
F-sharp major:  Rough ("rude")
B major:	     Energetic ("énergique")
E major:	     Radiant, warm, joyous ("éclatant, chaud, joyeux")
A major:	     Frank, sonorous ("franc, sonore")
D major:	     Joyful, brilliant, alert ("gai, brilland, alerte")
G major:	     Rural, merry ("champêtre, gai")
C major:	     Simple, naive, commonplace ("simple, naïf, franc, ou plat et commun")
F major:	     Pastoral, rustic ("pastoral, agreste")
B-flat major:   Noble and elegant, graceful ("noble et élégant, gracieux")
E-flat major:   Vigorous, chivalrous ("sonore, énergique, chevaleresque")
A-flat major:   Gentle, caressing, or pompous ("doux, caressant, ou pompeux")
D-flat major:   Charming, suave, placid ("plein de charme, placide, suave")
G-flat major:   Gentle and calm ("doux et calme")

C-flat major:   ? ("?")

Minor keys:

A-sharp minor:  ? ("?")

D-sharp minor:  ? ("?")
G-sharp minor:  Very somber ("très sombre")
C-sharp minor:  Brutal, sinister, or very sombre ("brutal, sinistre ou très sombre")
F-sharp minor:  Rough, or light, aerial ("rude ou léger, aérien")
B minor:        Savage or sombre but vigorous ("sauvage ou sombre, mais énergique")
E minor:        Sad, agitated ("triste, agité")
A minor:        Simple, naive, sad, rustic ("simple, naïf, triste, rustique")
D minor:        Serious, concentrated ("sérieux, concentré") 
G minor:        Melancholy, shy ("mélancolique, ombrageux") 
C minor:        Gloomy, dramatic, violent ("sombre, dramatique, violent") 
F minor:        Morose, surly, or energetic ("morose, chagrin, ou énergique") 
B-flat minor:   Funeral or mysterious ("funèbre ou mystérieux") 
E-flat minor:   Profoundly sad ("profondément triste")
A-flat minor:   Lugubrious, anguished ("lugubre, angoissé")

His more popularized works discussed the music dramas of Richard Wagner, summarised in Le Voyage artistique à Bayreuth.

Selected works
Lavignac edited the compendious .

  (1882)
 (1889)
 (1895). Translated into English, 1905
 (1897). An analysis of Wagner's leitmotifs
 (New York, 1899)

Footnotes

References
Gail Smith, "Keys and colors: is there a connection?"

External links

Public domain scan of Music and Musicians.

1846 births
1916 deaths
19th-century classical composers
19th-century French composers
19th-century French male musicians
19th-century French musicologists
20th-century classical composers
20th-century French composers
20th-century French male musicians
20th-century French musicologists
French Romantic composers
French male classical composers
French music educators
Academic staff of the Conservatoire de Paris
Conservatoire de Paris alumni
Musicians from Paris